Rex William Kern (born May 28, 1949) is a former American football player. He played professional football in the National Football League at defensive back for the Baltimore Colts and Buffalo Bills.  In college, Kern was the quarterback for the Ohio State Buckeyes from 1968 to 1970; the Buckeyes went undefeated in 1968 and were national champions. Kern was inducted into the College Football Hall of Fame in 2007.

Early years
Born and raised in Lancaster, Ohio, and the son of a barber, Kern was a star three-sport athlete for Lancaster High School and graduated in 1967. In baseball, he was drafted by the Kansas City Athletics, and was offered basketball scholarships to UCLA, North Carolina, and Ohio University. However Kern had long sought to play basketball for Fred Taylor of Ohio State and had fostered a relationship with Taylor that led to a scholarship offer.

During the recruiting process, he was also recruited by Woody Hayes and committed to Ohio State to play both sports.

College career
At Ohio State, Kern quarterbacked the freshman team in 1967, which included 11 high school All-Americans, but suffered a back injury playing freshman basketball. Despite back surgery in June, Kern recovered in time to be named first string quarterback for the varsity football team ahead of senior Bill Long, who had quarterbacked the Buckeyes in 1967.

Kern was the leader of the Buckeyes' Super Sophomores, and guided the Buckeyes to an undefeated season and a consensus national championship in 1968. The Super Sophomores finished their three-year varsity careers with a record  Kern was a fine passer and a dangerous runner.  In the 1968, 1969, and 1970 seasons, he ran for 583, 524, and 597 yards respectively—high numbers for a Big Ten quarterback.

The 1968 team shut out top-ranked Purdue on October 12 and went on to an undefeated season, a Big Ten championship, and a berth in the Rose Bowl. Kern was named Most Outstanding Player in the bowl as Ohio State defeated O. J. Simpson and the USC Trojans,  and were consensus national champions.

In 1969, the Buckeyes were expected to repeat as national champions. Kern directed a high-scoring (averaging 46 points per game) junior-dominated Buckeye offense that cruised through its first eight games. Despite the loss, Ohio State finished as Big Ten co-champions with Michigan and Kern was third in balloting for the 1969 Heisman Trophy. He was also named a first-team All-American. Ohio State did not play in a bowl game, because prior to the 1975 season, the Big Ten and Pac-8 conferences allowed just one bowl team each, to the Rose Bowl.

The super sophomores rebounded as seniors in 1970 to win the Big Ten title outright, gaining revenge against Michigan. The Buckeyes finished the regular season undefeated  earning another trip to Pasadena.  However, they were upset by the  led by quarterback Jim Plunkett, the Heisman Trophy winner. Kern, a team captain, finished fifth on the 1970 Heisman ballot.

Kern was elected to the Ohio State Varsity O Hall of Fame in 1978, was selected to the Ohio State Football All-Century Team in 2000, and the College Football Hall of Fame in 2007.

Professional career
Kern was selected in the tenth round of the 1971 NFL Draft by the defending NFL champion Baltimore Colts and played in all fourteen games in his rookie season, supplanting Jim Duncan as starting cornerback. He only made five starts in 1972 due to a recurrence of his back injury, and recovered to play a full season in 1973, with two interceptions.

Kern was the Colts' National Football League Players Association (NFLPA) representative during the union's strike prior to the  season. After the strike ended, he was waived when Baltimore general manager Joe Thomas acted on his threat to cut players who had walked out. Kern played eight games with the Buffalo Bills that season before ending his career as an active player due to chronic back problems.

Personal
Kern earned three degrees from Ohio State, a baccalaureate, a master's, and a Ph.D. in education. He credited his success to his education, and his education to Woody Hayes, with whom he had a lifelong friendship. In 2001, he created the Anne and Woody Hayes Endowment for the prevention of child abuse to Columbus Children's Hospital.

References

Further reading
Jim Tressel and Jeff Snook, What It Means To Be A Buckeye, "Rex Kern 1968–70", Triumph Books 2003,

External links
 

1949 births
Living people
People from Lancaster, Ohio
Players of American football from Ohio
American football defensive backs
American football quarterbacks
Ohio State Buckeyes football players
College Football Hall of Fame inductees
Baltimore Colts players
Buffalo Bills players